List of libraries and archives in Hamburg.

Libraries and archives 

In 2006, 39 public libraries existed in Hamburg, organised by the foundation Bücherhallen Hamburg, more than 20 academic libraries, and several special or museums libraries. 7.9 media per inhabitant were borrowed from the public libraries. Therefore, Hamburg, after Bremen (9.0), were ranking at the top of the German states.

There are also four main archives.

Libraries

Archives

See also 
 List of libraries in Germany

Notes

References 

 
Hamburg
Hamburg-related lists